The 2019 Nigeria Federation Cup (officially known as the 2019 AITEO Cup for sponsorship reasons) was the 73rd edition of the Nigerian Federation Cup. It was held between 3 May and 28 July 2019. The competition was contested by 74 teams, all which qualified via their state championships.

Kano Pillars defeated Niger Tornadoes 4–3 on penalties after the match ended goalless to win their second AITEO Cup title since 1953. As runners-up, Niger Tornadoes qualified for the 2019–20 CAF Confederation Cup since Kano Pillars had qualified for the 2019–20 CAF Champions League

Format 
The competition was a single elimination knockout tournament, 74 teams qualified via their state championships as winners or runners-up. 54 teams qualified directly to the First Round while the 10 winners from the Rookie stages joined them. All matches were held in neutral venues.

Schedule
The schedule of the competition was as follows.

Rookie play-offs
Matches were played on 3 May 2019.

Club's states in brackets.

|}

First round
The 10 winners from the Rookie round joined the 54 teams already qualified for the main tournament. Matches were played between 25 May 2019 and 16 June 2019.

Club's states in brackets.

|colspan="3" style="background-color:green1"|25 May 2019

|-
|colspan="3" style="background-color:green1"|26 May 2019

|-
|colspan="3" style="background-color:green1"|27 May 2019

|-
|colspan="3" style="background-color:green1"|28 May 2019

|-
|colspan="3" style="background-color:green1"|12 June 2019

|-
|colspan="3" style="background-color:green1"|15 June 2019

|-
|colspan="3" style="background-color:green1"|16 June 2019

|}

Second round
The 32 winners from the First round competed at this round. Matches were played on 19 and 20 June 2019.

Club's states in brackets.

|colspan="3" style="background-color:green1"|19 June 2019

|-
|colspan="3" style="background-color:green1"|20 June 2019

|}

Third round
Sixteen teams participated in this round. Matches were played on 23 and 24 June 2019.

Club's states in brackets.

|colspan="3" style="background-color:green1"|23 June 2019

|-
|colspan="3" style="background-color:green1"|24 June 2019

|}

Quarter-finals
Matches were played on 28 June 2019.

Club's states in brackets.

|}

Semi-finals
Matches were played on 4 July 2019.

Club's states in brackets.

|}

Final
The final was held on 28 July 2019  at the Ahmadu Bello Stadium in Kaduna after it was moved from the original date 24 July 2019.

Club's states in brackets.

|}

Notes

References

External links
AITEO Cup 2019 at RSSSF.com

2018–19 in Nigerian football
Fa Cup